Anita Kuhlke (later Sach, born 22 December 1947) is a retired East German rower. Between 1966 and 1972 she won all national titles and seven European medals in the single sculls, including four gold medals.

Kuhlke is a physician. She was married to Pavel Šach, a TV technician, and they have three children.

References

External links
 

1947 births
Living people
East German female rowers
Rowers from Berlin
European Rowing Championships medalists
20th-century German women